is a part of Yahata Nishi ward in Kitakyūshū, Japan. There are many schools and universities located near the central JR Orio Station, and also the Saint Mother's Byoin clinic which allegedly assisted Princess Masako with the birth of her daughter Princess Aiko.

Buildings and structures in Kitakyushu